The 2004 Supersport World Championship was the sixth FIM Supersport World Championship season—the eight taking into account the two held under the name of Supersport World Series. The season started on 29 February at Valencia and finished on 3 October at Magny-Cours after 10 races.

The riders' championship was won by Karl Muggeridge and the manufacturers' championship was won by Honda. Karl Muggeridge won a total of 7 races, a new record for the class.

Race calendar and results

Championship standings

Riders' standings

Manufacturers' standings

 The top six Honda riders were disqualified from the Oschersleben race results after discrepancies were found in the homologation weight of the rear wheel spindle. The Honda factory informed the FIM that an error was made when filling in the homologation documents. The FIM verified Honda's claim and decided to revoke the decision for the riders. However the points were withdrawn from Honda in the manufacturers' championship.

Entry list

References

External links

Supersport
Supersport World Championship seasons
World
World
World